The Omineca Mountains, also known as "the Ominecas", are a group of remote mountain ranges in the Boreal Cordillera of north-central British Columbia, Canada.  They are bounded by the Finlay River on the north, the Rocky Mountain Trench (here filled by Lake Williston) on the east, the Nation Lakes on the south, and the upper reaches of the Omineca River on the west.  They form a section of the Continental Divide, that, in this region, separates water drainage between the Arctic and Pacific Oceans. The lower course of the Omineca River flows through the heart of the range. To the south of the Ominecas is the Nechako Plateau, to the west the Skeena Mountains and Hazelton Mountains, to the north the Spatsizi Plateau and the Stikine Ranges, while east across the Rocky Mountain Trench are the Muskwa Ranges.

"The Omineca" or "the Omineca Country" is the entire area plus some of the northern Nechako Plateau adjacent to the Ominecas, where there has been more settlement and, in the past, extensive gold-mining exploration and prospecting (in the same period as the Omineca, Fraser Canyon and Cariboo Gold Rushes, i.e. 1860s).

Sub-ranges

Finlay Ranges
Butler Range
Russel Range
Hogem Ranges
Axelgold Range
Cariboo Heart Range
Connelly Range
Mitchell Range
Sikanni Range
Sitlika Range
Vital Range
Metsantan Range
Samuel Black Range
Swannell Ranges
Espee Range
Fishing Range
Germansen Range
Ingenika Range
Kwanika Range
Kwun Yótasi Range
Lay Range
McConnell Range
Osilinka Ranges
Peak Range
Tenakihi Range
Tucha Range
Wolverine Range
Wrede Range
Tatlatui Range

Rivers
Finlay River
Firesteel River
Germansen River
Mosque River
Omineca River
Toodoggone River

See also 
 Omineca Country
 Omineca Gold Rush
 Omineca Cablevision
 Prince George-Omineca
 Omineca (electoral district)

References

Omineca Mountains in the Canadian Mountain Encyclopedia

 
Omineca Country